Ferenc Lőrincz may refer to:
 Ferenc Lőrincz (ice hockey)
 Ferenc Lőrincz (speed skater)